Jack Ary (23 November 1919 – 23 September 1974) was a French film and television actor.

Selected filmography

 My Wife Is Formidable (1951) - Un pensionnaire de l'hôtel (uncredited)
 Massacre in Lace (1952) - Un danseur (uncredited)
 Monsieur Leguignon Lampiste (1952) - Un habitant du quartier (uncredited)
 Allô... je t'aime (1952)
 La Putain respectueuse (1952) - Un routier (uncredited)
 La danseuse nue (1952)
 Crazy for Love (1952) - Un journaliste (uncredited)
 A Hundred Francs a Second (1952) - Un cheminot en grève (uncredited)
 Le dernier Robin des Bois (1952) - (uncredited)
 Le témoin de minuit (1953)
 The Long Teeth (1953) - Le chauffeur de M. Wamter (uncredited)
 Wonderful Mentality (1953) - Un gendarme
 Le gang des pianos à bretelles (1953)
 Au diable la vertu (1953) - Le gendarme de garde
 The Tour of the Grand Dukes (1953) - Un homme au 'Balajo' (uncredited)
 La môme vert-de-gris (1953) - Un homme de Rudy
 Une vie de garçon (1953) - Le garçon de café
 The Most Wanted Man (1953) - (uncredited)
 Women of Paris (1953) - Le cow-boy (uncredited)
 The Women Couldn't Care Less (1954) - Casa Antica's Waiter (uncredited)
 C'est la vie parisienne (1954) - L'agent (uncredited)
 The Pirates of the Bois de Boulogne (1954) - L'agent de police
 Death on the Run (1954) - Un agent
 Cadet Rousselle (1954) - Un hallebardier (uncredited)
 Yours Truly, Blake (1954) - L'inspecteur Brevan
 The Infiltrator (1955) - Un inspecteur
 The Impossible Mr. Pipelet (1955) - Un pompier
 Je suis un sentimental (1955) - Le barman (uncredited)
 La Madelon (1955) - Un blessé qui assiste au gala (uncredited)
 Mémoires d'un flic (1956) - Un inspecteur
 People of No Importance (1956) - Un routier
 Meeting in Paris (1956) - Le premier agent (uncredited)
 Short Head (1956) - Un inspecteur (uncredited)
 Paris Palace Hotel (1956) - Petit rôle (uncredited)
 Alerte au deuxième bureau (1956)
 La terreur des dames (1956)
 Bonjour Toubib (1957) - Le garçon de café
 Les 3 font la paire (1957) - Un gangster (uncredited)
 Sénéchal the Magnificent (1957) - Un gangster complice de Mado (uncredited)
 Love in the Afternoon (1957) - Love on Right Bank (uncredited)
 L'inspecteur aime la bagarre (1957) - Un gangster
 La roue (1957)
 Mademoiselle and Her Gang (1957) - Émile l'Africain - le troisième truand
 Nous autres à Champignol (1957) - Un sportif de Champignol
 À pied, à cheval et en voiture (1957) - (uncredited)
 Les Espions (1957) - Le serveur du wagon-restaurant (uncredited)
 Mademoiselle Strip-tease (1957) - Brutus
 Sinners of Paris (1958) - (uncredited)
 Secrets of a French Nurse (1958) - Nino
 Le temps des oeufs durs (1958) - Le vendeur d'oreillers
 A Certain Monsieur Jo (1958) - Charlot
 Gigi (1958) - Waiter at "Palais de Glace" (uncredited)
 School for Coquettes (1958)
 Me and the Colonel (1958) - German Sergeant (uncredited)
 La môme aux boutons (1958) - Le photographe
 Le Sicilien (1958) - (uncredited)
 Suivez-moi jeune homme (1958) - (uncredited)
 Les motards (1959) - Un motard
 The Indestructible (1959)
 La valse du gorille (1959) - (uncredited)
 Le gendarme de Champignol (1959) - Le droguiste
 La bête à l'affût (1959) - Un inspecteur
 Arrêtez le massacre (1959)
 Préméditation (1960)
 Bouche cousue (1960)
 Recours en grâce (1960) - Georges
 Fanny (1961) - Sailor (uncredited)
 Dynamite Jack (1961) - John (uncredited)
 Tales of Paris (1962) - Pidoux (segment "Ella")
 Le Crime ne paie pas (1962) - Un inspecteur (segment "L'homme de l'avenue") (uncredited)
 Gigot (1962) - Blade
 Jusqu'au bout du monde (1963)
 People in Luck (1963) - Un policier (segment "Le gros lot") (uncredited)
 The Sucker (1965) - Le douanier-chef
 Furia a Marrakech (1966)
 Flashman (1967) - Inspector Baxter
 Le permis de conduire (1974)
 Eugène Sue (1974, TV Movie) - Maréchal Soult
 Pourquoi? (1977) - (final film role)

References

Bibliography 
 Philippe Arnaud. Sacha Guitry, cinéaste. Editions du Festival international du film de Locarno, 1993.

External links 
 

1919 births
1974 deaths
French male film actors
French male television actors